Amsels' hawkmoth (Rethera amseli) is a moth of the family Sphingidae first described by Franz Daniel in 1958. It is known from western Afghanistan.

The wingspan is 34–43 mm. It is similar to Rethera brandti, but larger and with paler markings.

Adults are on wing in mid-April. There is one generation per year.

References

Macroglossini
Moths described in 1958